The Palais Flemming-Sulkowski was a Baroque city mansion in Dresden, Germany. It stood on the Inneren Pirnaischen Gasse, on the site now occupied by the city's Landhaus.

Baroque architecture in Dresden
Flemming-Sulkowski